Foreign Missions Society or Société des Missions-Étrangères may refer to:

 Société des Missions-Étrangères du Québec, founded in Quebec, Canada in 1921
 Paris Foreign Missions Society (Société des Missions Étrangères de Paris), founded in Paris, France in 1660
 Saint Patrick's Society for the Foreign Missions, founded in 1932, headquartered in Ireland
 Catholic Foreign Mission Society of America, founded in Hawthorne, New York in 1912
 American Baptist Foreign Mission Society, founded in 1814, headquartered in King of Prussia, Pennsylvania, now International Ministries